These were the team rosters of the nations participating in the men's ice hockey tournament of the 2018 Winter Olympics. Each team was permitted a roster of 22 skaters and 3 goaltenders.

After five consecutive Olympic tournaments in which the National Hockey League (the world's premier professional league) allowed its players to participate in the Olympics and adjusted its schedule to accommodate the tournament, the NHL announced in 2017 that it would prohibit any player under NHL contract, including those not actually playing for an NHL team, from participating in the Olympics. The NHL secured the cooperation of the International Ice Hockey Federation and the IOC ensuring that nations would not be allowed to ask NHL players to participate.

Unlike the NHL, the vast majority of European leagues accommodated an Olympic break, headlined by Russia-based KHL's 33-day break, Sweden-based Swedish Hockey League's 14-day break, Switzerland-based National League's 25-day break, German-based Eishockey Liga's 26-day break, Czech Republic-based Extraliga's 18-day break, and Slovakia-based Tipsport liga's 14-day break. Conversely, Finland-based SM-liiga did not accommodate a break but allowed its top players to leave the clubs and participate in the Olympic Games.

Statistics

Average age
Team Canada was the oldest team in the tournament, averaging 31 years. Gold medal winner Team Russia was the youngest, averaging 28 years. The tournament average was 29 years and 6 months.

Group A

Canada
The following is the Canadian roster for the men's ice hockey tournament at the 2018 Winter Olympics.

Head coach:  Willie Desjardins     Assistant coaches:  Dave King,  Scott Walker,  Craig Woodcroft

Czech Republic
The following is the Czech roster for the men's ice hockey tournament at the 2018 Winter Olympics.

Head coach:  Josef Jandač     Assistant coaches:  Jiří Kalous,  Václav Prospal,  Jaroslav Špaček

South Korea
The following is the South Korean roster for the men's ice hockey tournament at the 2018 Winter Olympics.

Head coach:  Jim Paek     Assistant coaches:  Kim Woo-jae,  Son Ho-seung,  Richard Park

Switzerland
The following is the Swiss roster for the men's ice hockey tournament at the 2018 Winter Olympics.

Head coach:  Patrick Fischer     Assistant coaches:  Christian Wohlwend,  Tommy Albelin

Forward Joël Vermin was also selected but was unable to participate due to injury. He was replaced by Grégory Hofmann.

Group B

Olympic Athletes from Russia
The following is the Olympic Athletes from Russia roster for the men's ice hockey tournament at the 2018 Winter Olympics.

Head coach:  Oleg Znarok     Assistant coaches:  Harijs Vītoliņš,  Rashit Davydov,  Igor Nikitin,  Alexei Zhamnov

Slovakia
The following is the Slovak roster for the men's ice hockey tournament at the 2018 Winter Olympics.

Head coach:  Craig Ramsay     Assistant coaches:  Ján Lašák,  Vladimír Országh

Slovenia
The following is the Slovenian roster for the men's ice hockey tournament at the 2018 Winter Olympics.

Head coach:  Kari Savolainen     Assistant coaches:  Nik Zupančič,  Edo Terglav

United States
The following is the American roster for the men's ice hockey tournament at the 2018 Winter Olympics.

Head coach:  Tony Granato     Assistant coaches:  Keith Allain,  Chris Chelios,  Scott Young

Group C

Finland
The following is the Finnish roster for the men's ice hockey tournament at the 2018 Winter Olympics.

Head coach:  Lauri Marjamäki     Assistant coaches:  Ari Hilli,  Mikko Manner,  Jussi Tapola

Germany
A preliminary 30-man German roster for the men's ice hockey tournament at the 2018 Winter Olympics was released on 16 January 2018. The final roster was announced on 23 January 2017, with 5 players being cut, including Daniel Pietta who was injured prior to the final announcement.

Head coach:  Marco Sturm     Assistant coaches:  Christian Künast,  Matt McIlvane

Norway
The following is the roster of the Norway national team for the men's ice hockey tournament at the 2018 Winter Olympics.

Head coach:  Petter Thoresen     Assistant coach:  Sjur Robert Nilsen

Sweden
The following is the Swedish roster for the men's ice hockey tournament at the 2018 Winter Olympics.

Head coach:  Rikard Grönborg     Assistant coaches:  Johan Garpenlöv,  Peter Popovic

See also
Ice hockey at the 2018 Winter Olympics – Women's team rosters

References

rosters
2018